Billboard Top Country & Western Records of 1953 is made up of two year-end charts compiled by Billboard magazine ranking the year's top country and western records based on record sales and juke box plays.

Hank Williams died on January 1, 1953. Despite his passing, Williams dominated the country and western charts in 1953. He had five songs on the year-end charts, and "Kaw-Liga" and "Your Cheating Heart" were the year's No. 1 and No. 2 selling country records. In addition, Jack Cardwell's "The Death of Hank Williams" ranked No. 19 on the year-end chart.

On the juke box chart, "Mexican Joe" by newcomer Jim Reeves was the No. 1 most-played record of 1953.

See also
List of Billboard number-one country songs of 1953
Billboard year-end top 30 singles of 1953
1953 in country music

Notes

References

1953 record charts
Billboard charts
1953 in American music